Vellavu is a place in the Pariyaram gram panchayat of the Kannur District, state of Kerala, India.

Location
Vellavu is situated on the bank of Vellavu river. (commonly known as Kuppam River). On the north it is bounded by Mavichery, on the south by Thalora, on the east by Nellipparamba, and on the west by Kuttiyeri. Ezhukunnu is a hill station on the bank of the Vellavu River. The Taliparamba Rajarajeswara temple and Thrichambaram Sreekrishna temple are very near to this place. The villagers are mainly engaged in agricultural works.

Important Landmarks

 K K N Pariyaram Memorial Building (CPM Office)
 Kuttyeri Service Co-operative Bank
This is one of the leading primary co-operative banks in Kannur having Four branches in and around Kuttyeri village.
 Kuttiyeri Post Office
 Sri Dakshinamoorthy Temple (Vellavu kavu)
One of the most ancient and biggest temples in north Kerala of Lord Dakshinamoorthy. The idol is called "Swayamboo".

 Sri Muchilottu Bhagagavathi Temple
Here the god is Muchilottu Bhagavathi. The main festival in this temple is 'Kaliyattam', which is celebrated in a period of 14 years. Last Kaliyattam was held in the year Feb 2002.

 Sri Kaithakeel Bhagavathi Temple
Here the god is Kaithakeel Amma. The main festival in this temple is 'Kaliyattam', which is celebrated once in a year.
 "Red Star sports& arts club"  vellavu   is one of the oldest of its kind in Kannur district.
 Vikas Reading Room - one of the best library in the village is also there.
 Kuttiyeri Veterinary hospital
It is the only veterinary hospital in pariyaram grama panchayath.

Facilities
 Vellavu LP School (School Code: 13738)
 Kuttyeri Post office situated at Vellavu
 Pariyaram Panchayath Veterinary hospital, Vellavu
 NRHM Homeo dispensary, Vellavu
 Vellavu Samskarika Vayanasala & Grandhalayam
 Vellavu Aanganwadi
 Redstar Arts & Sports Club
 Kairali cultural centre
 Vikas Reading Room & library
 Taliparamba Arts & Science College situated at Chenayannur is at a distance of 3 Km from Vellavu
 Red Revengers vellavu
 sanghachethana thattummal

Climate

 Summer – 
 Winter – 
 Rainfall: Like other places in Kerala (June to September)

Transportation
The national highway passes through Taliparamba town. Goa and Mumbai can be accessed on the northern side and Cochin and Thiruvananthapuram can be accessed on the southern side. Neighbouring village of Pariyaram on the North side of kuppam river is accessible through kuttiyeri bridge. Taliparamba has a good bus station and buses are easily available to all parts of Kannur district.  The road to the east of Iritty connects to Mysore and Bangalore.  But buses to these cities are available only from Kannur, 22 km to the south. The nearest railway stations are Kannapuram  and Kannur on Mangalore-Palakkad line. 
Trains are available to almost all parts of India subject to advance booking over the internet.  There are airports at Kannur, Mangalore and Calicut. All of them are small international airports with direct flights available only to Middle Eastern countries.

Buses and taxis are available from Taliparamba town to reach Vellavu, and Balambika is an oldest and still continuing bus service to Vellavu.

See also

 Kuppam
 Taliparamba
 Kuttiyeri
 Thiruvattoor
 Mukkunnu

References

External links 
 Muchilottu Bhagavathi's Story

Villages near Taliparamba
Hill stations in Kerala
Populated places in the Western Ghats
Geography of Kannur district